Karl Hipfinger (October 28, 1905 – April 20, 1984) was an Austrian weightlifter who competed in the 1928 and 1932 Summer Olympics.

He was born in Vienna.

In 1928 he failed to set a mark in the clean and jerk competition of the middleweight class.

Four years later, at the 1932 games, he won a bronze medal in the middleweight class.

References 
 

1905 births
1984 deaths
Austrian male weightlifters
Olympic weightlifters of Austria
Weightlifters at the 1928 Summer Olympics
Weightlifters at the 1932 Summer Olympics
Olympic bronze medalists for Austria
World record setters in weightlifting
Olympic medalists in weightlifting
Medalists at the 1932 Summer Olympics
20th-century Austrian people